The Bear Creek Redoubt near Ashland, Kansas was listed on the National Register of Historic Places in 1978.

It was built in fall of 1870 as a military outpost to protect mail and other shipments.

See also
Cimarron Redoubt

References

Archaeological sites on the National Register of Historic Places in Kansas
Clark County, Kansas
Forts on the National Register of Historic Places in Kansas